Vermont Health Connect  is the health insurance marketplace, previously known as health insurance exchange, in the U.S. state of Vermont, created in accordance with the Patient Protection and Affordable Care Act. The marketplace operates a web site.

The marketplace is offered to individuals and families who are not covered by their employer. It allows enrollees  to compare health insurance plans and provides those who qualify with access to tax credits.

History
The Vermont marketplace web site was developed by CGI Group.

Enrollment via the marketplace began on October 1, 2013. Mark Larson, Commissioner of the Department of Vermont Health Access (DVHA), said there were more than 30,000 people who logged in during the first four days of October.  Larson stepped down from his position in March 2015.

There have been problems with the service, including billing related issues, which the state is trying to overcome.

References

External links
Official Website
DVHA Website

Vermont
Healthcare in Vermont
Vermont